Francisco Vazzoler (born 22 April 1989) is an Argentine professional footballer who plays as a forward.

Career
Vazzoler began his career in the ranks of Unión Santa Fe, making his professional debut in April 2010 after featuring for the final twenty minutes of a 3–0 defeat to San Martín. Two more appearances fell his way during the 2009–10 Primera B Nacional season. After not playing for the club in 2010–11, Vazzoler left them to join Torneo Argentino A's Racing de Olavarría. Ten games and one goal followed in six months, which preceded the forward joining Blooming of the Bolivian Primera División in January 2012. His first appearance came against Aurora on 29 January, with his first goal arriving on 8 February versus Guabirá.

Vazzoler rejoined Racing de Olavarría in July 2012, subsequently participating in thirty-one fixtures and scoring eight times during 2012–13. Vazzoler had a two season stint with Torneo Argentino A side Gimnasia y Tiro between 2013 and 2014, before spending the next two years with Colegiales in Primera B Metropolitana. He scored in eleven fixtures in his debut season of 2015, prior to netting four in 2016. Vazzoler agreed to sign for Platense on 17 July 2016, which was followed by a season with fellow third tier outfit Defensores de Belgrano a year later. He made sixty-seven appearances and scored sixteen goals for those teams.

August 2018 saw Vazzoler join Chacarita Juniors in Primera B Nacional, a league his former two teams won promotion to in the previous campaign. He scored his first goal for Chacarita Juniors during his first start on 22 September, netting the winner in a 2–1 win over Villa Dálmine. Vazzoler terminated his contract with the club at the end of the year, subsequently moving to Chile to join Deportes Copiapó.

Career statistics
.

Personal life
His older brother, Nicolás Vazzoler, is a football coach who has mainly worked as an assistant. They have run into at Chilean Primera B side Deportes Copiapó on 2020.

References

External links

1989 births
Living people
People from Esperanza, Santa Fe
Argentine footballers
Association football forwards
Argentine expatriate footballers
Expatriate footballers in Bolivia
Expatriate footballers in Chile
Argentine expatriate sportspeople in Bolivia
Argentine expatriate sportspeople in Chile
Primera Nacional players
Torneo Argentino A players
Bolivian Primera División players
Torneo Federal A players
Primera B Metropolitana players
Unión de Santa Fe footballers
Racing de Olavarría footballers
Club Blooming players
Gimnasia y Tiro footballers
Club Atlético Colegiales (Argentina) players
Club Atlético Platense footballers
Defensores de Belgrano footballers
Chacarita Juniors footballers
Deportes Copiapó footballers
Sportspeople from Santa Fe Province